Gibisonville is an unincorporated community in Hocking County, Ohio, United States.

History
Gibisonville was laid out in 1840. The community was named for its founders, Samuel and William Gibison. A post office was established at Gibisonville in 1850, and remained in operation until 1969.

References

Unincorporated communities in Hocking County, Ohio
Unincorporated communities in Ohio